The (Roman Catholic) Diocese of Ratchaburi (Diœcesis Ratchaburensis) is a Latin suffragan diocese of the archdiocese of Bangkok  in western central Thailand.

As of 2001, of the 2.2 million citizens, 15,246 are members of the Catholic Church. It is divided into 17 parishes, having 71 priests altogether.

While the cathedral episcopal see dedicated to the Nativity of Our Lady is at Bang Nok Khwaek, the diocesan center is in the town of Ratchaburi.

History 
The diocese dates back to 30 June 1930, when the Mission sui iuris of Rajaburi was created, originally responsible for the south and west of Thailand, on territory split off from the then Apostolic Vicariate of Bangkok (now its Metropolitan). It was run by the Salesian order, who came there in 1927 and supplied the missionary Ordinaries. The 18 missionaries took over a mission previously run by the Paris Foreign Missionaries.
 
On 28 May 1934 it was elevated to Apostolic Prefecture of Rajaburi; on 3 March 1941 to Apostolic Vicariate of Rajaburi, hence entitled to a titular bishop.
 
On 18 December 1965 it became the Diocese of Bangnokhuek. On 21 October 1966 it was renamed Diocese of Ratburi.
 
On 26 June 1969 the Diocese of Surat Thani was split off from the diocese (a fellow suffragan of Bangkok), which continued to be run by Salesians, while the remainder, again renamed Diocese of Ratchaburi, was since then under the responsibility of native priests.

Cathedral  

The cathedral of the diocese is the Nativity of Our Lady Cathedral (Thai: อาสนวิหารแม่พระบังเกิด). It is in Bang Nok Khwaek, Amphoe Bang Khonthi, Samut Songkhram Province. The church is built in French Gothic style and decorated with stained glass windows imported from France. In two rows these show scenes of the life of Jesus in top row, as well as holy people (men to the north, women to the south).

Around 1840 nine Chinese Catholic families moved to the rim of the Mae Klong River. The community grew to about 200 Catholics until 1847, when a first wooden church named Sala Daeng (Red Hall) or Raung Yao (Long Canal) was built near the site of the current cathedral. In 1850 Father Marin bought the land at the mouth of the Khlong Damnoen Saduak and donated it to the church.

In 1890 the French missionary Father Paulo Salmon started construction of the Nativity of Our Lady church, which was inaugurated on 2 February 1896. During World War II several of the windows broke, which took until 1993 to be fully repaired. In 1994-1999 a major renovation of the cathedral was undertaken, overseen by Father Pradit.

Ordinaries 
(all Roman Rite)
Ecclesiastical Superior of Rajaburi 
 Gaétan Pasotti, Salesians (S.D.B.) (1931 – 1934.05.28 see below)

Apostolic Prefect of Rajaburi 
 Gaétan Pasotti, S.D.B. (see above 1934.05.28 – 1941.04.03 see below)

Apostolic Vicars of Rajaburi
 Gaétan Pasotti , S.D.B. (see above 1941.04.03 – death 1950.09.03), Titular Bishop of Barata (1941.04.03 – 1950.09.03)
 (Pietro) Luigi Carretto, S.D.B. (1951.04.12 – 1965.12.18 see below), Titular Bishop of Zenobias (1951.04.12 – 1965.12.18)

Suffragan Bishop of Bangnokhuek
 Pietro Luigi Carretto, S.D.B. (see above 1965.12.18 – 1966.10.21 see below)

Suffragan Bishop of Ratburi
 Pietro Luigi Carretto, S.D.B. (see above 1966.10.21 – 1969.06.26), later Bishop of Surat Thani (Thailand) (1969.06.26 – 1988.06.21)

Suffragan Bishops of Ratchaburi 
 Robert Ratna Bamrungtrakul (June 26, 1969 - April 28, 1975), also President of Bishops' Conference of Thailand (1973 – 1979); later bishop of Chiang Mai (1975.04.28 – 1986.10.17)
 Joseph Ek Thabping (October 2, 1975 - February 12, 1985 died)
 John Bosco Manat Chuabsamai (November 25, 1985 - July 24, 2003 resigned)
''Apostolic Administrator (2003.06.20 – 2005.03.18) Lawrence Thienchai Samanchit, while Bishop of Chanthaburi (Thailand) (1971.07.03 – 2009.04.04 retired)
 John Bosco Panya Kritcharoen (March 18, 2005 - ...)

See also
Beata Mundi Regina
Roman Catholicism in Thailand

Sources and external links
 GigaCatholic
 Website of the diocese - in Thai
 catholic-hierarchy.org 

Ratchaburi
Ratchaburi
1930 establishments in Siam